Zeni may refer to:

 Zeni (letter), a letter of the Georgian alphabet
 Zeni, Iran, a village in South Khorasan Province, Iran
 Zeni Husmani (born 1990), Macedonian footballer
 Zeni (surname), surname

See also
 Zenigata Heiji, a fictional policeman
Italian-language surnames
Surnames of South Tyrolean origin